Ferr Smith (born September 10, 1941) is an American politician. He is a member of the Mississippi House of Representatives from the 23rd District, being first elected in 1992. He is a member of the Democratic party.

References

1941 births
Living people
Democratic Party members of the Mississippi House of Representatives
People from Carthage, Mississippi
21st-century American politicians